Elaine Nalee, is an American actress best known for her roles in Surface, Star Trek: The Next Generation and Sleepy Hollow. She currently resides in Sheridan, Wyoming and Burgaw, North Carolina

Career
Nalee was born in Sheridan, Wyoming. She earned a Bachelor of Arts degree in speech and drama from the University of Colorado Boulder and attended to the Webber Douglas Academy of Dramatic Art in London.

Career 
In 1981, she played the role Susan in the series Kelly. In the same year, she appeared in the series The Littlest Hobo. Then in 1994, she appeared in the series Abused and betrayed and Against Her Will: The Carrie Buck Story. She appeared as a female survivor in the first season of Star Trek: The Next Generation. From 1982 to 1987, she made a recurring role in the television series Capitol.

In 2005, she played the role Beth Wemuth in the horror comedy film The Pigs, directed by Onur Tukel.

Filmography

Film

Television

References

Living people
South African television actresses
South African film actresses
People from Durban
Year of birth missing (living people)